Marcillada is a genus of moths of the family Erebidae. The genus was erected by Francis Walker in 1865.

Species
Marcillada endopolia Hampson, 1926 Borneo, Sumatra, Java
Marcillada rubricosa Walker, 1865 Cambodia

References

Calpinae